The following highways are numbered 85.

International
 Asian Highway 85
 European route E85

Australia
 Goldfields Way, New South Wales
 Flinders Island, Tasmania
 Queensland State Route from Bribie Island to Nindigully, with sections as listed below:
Bribie Island Road - From Bribie Island to Caboolture
D'Aguilar Highway - From Caboolture to Harlin
Brisbane Valley Highway - From Harlin to Esk
Esk–Hampton Road - From Esk to Hampton
New England Highway - From Hampton to Toowoomba
Gore Highway - From Toowoomba to 19 km north of Goondiwindi
Leichhardt Highway - From 19 km north of Goondiwindi to Goondiwindi
Barwon Highway - From Goondiwindi to Nindigully

Canada
 Highway 85 (Ontario)
 Winnipeg Route 85
 Quebec Autoroute 85

China 
  G85 Expressway

Iceland
 Route 85 (Iceland)

India
 National Highway 85 (India)

Israel
Highway 85 (Israel)

Mexico
 Mexican Federal Highway 85
 Mexican Federal Highway 85D

New Zealand
  New Zealand State Highway 85

United States
 Interstate 85
 U.S. Route 85
 Alabama State Route 85
 Arizona State Route 85
 Arkansas Highway 85
 California State Route 85
Colorado State Highway 85 (1923) (former)
Colorado State Highway 85 (1938–1953) (former)
 Connecticut Route 85
 Florida State Road 85
 Georgia State Route 85
 Georgia State Route 85W (former)
 Georgia State Route 85E (former)
 Illinois Route 85 (former)
 Iowa Highway 85
 K-85 (Kansas highway)
 Kentucky Route 85
 Louisiana Highway 85
 Louisiana State Route 85 (former)
 Maine State Route 85
 Maryland Route 85
Maryland Route 85B
 Massachusetts Route 85
 M-85 (Michigan highway)
 Minnesota State Highway 85 (former)
 County Road 85 (Dakota County, Minnesota)
 Missouri Route 85
 Montana Highway 85
 Nebraska Highway 85
 Nebraska Highway 85N (former)
 Nebraska Highway 85S (former)
 Nebraska Link 85F
 Nebraska Spur 85B
 Nebraska Spur 85C
 Nebraska Spur 85D
 Nebraska Spur 85E
 Nebraska Spur 85H
 Nebraska Recreation Road 85G
 Nevada State Route 85 (former)
 New Hampshire Route 85
 New Jersey Route 85 (former)
 County Route 85 (Bergen County, New Jersey)
 County Route 85 (Ocean County, New Jersey)
 New York State Route 85
 County Route 85 (Cattaraugus County, New York)
 County Route 85 (Chautauqua County, New York)
 County Route 85 (Chemung County, New York)
 County Route 85 (Dutchess County, New York)
 County Route 85 (Erie County, New York)
 County Route 85 (Jefferson County, New York)
 County Route 85 (Madison County, New York)
 County Route 85 (Nassau County, New York)
 County Route 85 (Niagara County, New York)
 County Route 85 (Oneida County, New York)
 County Route 85 (Orange County, New York)
 County Route 85 (Rensselaer County, New York)
 County Route 85 (Rockland County, New York)
 County Route 85 (Suffolk County, New York)
 North Carolina Highway 85 (former)
 Ohio State Route 85
 Oklahoma State Highway 85
 Pennsylvania Route 85
 South Carolina Highway 85 (former)
 South Dakota Highway 85 (former)
 Tennessee State Route 85
 Texas State Highway 85
 Texas State Highway Spur 85
 Farm to Market Road 85
 Utah State Route 85
 Virginia State Route 85 (1933–1958) (former)
 West Virginia Route 85
 Wisconsin Highway 85

Territories
 U.S. Virgin Islands Highway 85

See also
List of highways numbered 85A
A85